Wie or WIE may refer to:

 Y, the twenty-fifth letter of the Latin alphabet, pronounced wie

People 
 Michelle Wie West (born 1989), American professional golfer
 Ole Petter Wie (born 1966), Norwegian businessman
 Virginia Van Wie (1909–1997), American amateur golfer

Other uses
 Windows Internet Explorer, a web browser
 Wiesenhof–Felt, a cycling team
 Wik-Epa language, a Paman language spoken in Australia

See also

 
 
 
 Y (disambiguation)
 Wi (disambiguation)
 We (disambiguation)
 Wee (disambiguation)
 Wye (disambiguation)
 Why (disambiguation)
 WY (disambiguation)